The 2008 Pulitzer Prizes were announced on April 7, 2008, the 92nd annual awards. 

The Washington Post won six awards, second only to the seven won by The New York Times in 2002. Three organizations were awarded prizes for the first time: Reuters, Investor's Business Daily and the Concord Monitor. No prize was given for editorial writing.

Journalism

Letters, Drama and Music Awards

Special Citation
Bob Dylan received a special citation for "his profound impact on popular music and American culture, marked by lyrical compositions of extraordinary poetic power."

References

External links
 
 "2008 Pulitzer Prizes for Journalism". The New York Times.
 "2008 Pulitzer Prizes for Letters, Drama and Music". The New York Times.

Pulitzer Prizes by year
Pulitzer Prize, 2008
Pulitzer Prize
Pulitzer Prize, 2008